Khawaja are prominent branch of Khawaja in South Asia.

Name
Khawaja is an honorific title used across the Middle East, South Asia, Southeast Asia and Central Asia, particularly towards Sufi teachers. It is also used by Kashmiri Muslims and the Mizrahi Jews—particularly Persian Jews and Baghdadi Jews. The word comes from the Iranian word khwāja (Classical Persian:  khwāja; Dari khājah; Tajik khoja). The spellings hodja or hoca (Turkish), খাজা (Khaaja)  (Bengali), hodža (Bosnian), hoxha (Albanian), хоџа (Serbian), χότζας (chótzas) (Greek), hogea (Romanian), koja (Javanese). The name is also used in Egypt and Sudan to indicate a person with a foreign nationality or foreign heritage.

Marriage customs
Khawaja people usually marry within their own social affiliation that is "Khawaja". They marry regardless of status wealth or class discrimination. Depending on circumstances a group (clan) may be as small as few hundred families and as large as few thousand families. For example, in the Bhat clan's definition, their clan system is to be an entire group having very few sub-groups, whereas Khawajas are branched into a dozen or two sub-groups. For the Bhat clan (a Kashmiri clan) a group, by and large, usually shares an ancestral village in Kashmir as a reference point.
Marriage into a family other than Khawaja family and between first cousins was discouraged in the past. Marriages to men outside the social group, i.e. the Khawaja clan (e.g. marrying outside such as Muslim Punjabi families), is now welcomed and accepted by a few Khawaja families, although some community elders may still discourage it.
Although most of the departed Group of families who are out of the Family clan system (Baradari) are not following the antique family traditions.

People using the name Khawaja
Significant figures with the name, or using the title Khawaja in South Asia include:

Khawaja Moinuddin Chishty, also known as Khwaja Gharib Nawaz was a Sunni Muslim and is the most famous Sufi saint of the Chishti Order of South Asia. He was born in 536 A.H./1141 CE, in Sajistan, a famous city in Khorasan province (other accounts say Isfahan) in Persia. He is also known as "Sultan-e-Hind."
Fariduddin Ganjshakar Khawaja Farid (Punjabi/Saraiki: خواجہ فرید)he was a great Sufi his shrine is located in the city of Pakpattan, otherwise Pākpattan Sharīf.
Khwaja Nizamuddin
Khwaja Qutbuddin Bakhtiar Kaki(born 1173-died 1235) was a renowned Muslim Sufi mystic, saint and scholar of the Chishti Order from Delhi, India.
Khwaja Jalaluddin Surkh-Posh Bukhari was a prominent "Suhrawardiyya" Sufi saint and missionary. Bukhari was called Surkh-posh ("Red-clad") on account of the red mantle he often wore.
Khwaja Shamsuddin Azeemi
Abu Yusuf Bin Saamaan, 
Maudood Chishti, 
Khwaja Wali Kirani
Baha-ud-Din Naqshband Bukhari

شیخ دانیار
Khawaja
Sayyid
Abu Yusuf Bin Saamaan, 
Maudood Chishti, 
Khwaja Wali Kirani

References

Social groups of Pakistan
Surnames
Shaikh clans
Social groups of India